Viralukketha Veekkam is a 1999 Indian Tamil-language comedy drama film directed by V. Sekhar. The film stars Livingston, Vadivelu, Vivek, Khushbu, Kovai Sarala and Kanaka. It was released on 16 July 1999 and became successful at the box-office. The film was remade into Telugu as Kshemamga Velli Labhamga Randi (2000), into Kannada as Yaarige Saluthe Sambala (2000) and into Hindi as Aamdani Atthanni Kharcha Rupaiya (2001).

Plot 
Ravishankar, Kabali and Ramanathan are a trio of friends who happen to live in a small colony with their wives Suguna, Ranjitham and Malu. The men work in the same factory and their wives happen to share a good rapport among themselves.

The men are quite irresponsible and carefree by nature and spend heftily on alcohol and other less important means of entertainment and owing to this, their wives have an uphill task at their hands every month to make ends meet.

When the men lose their jobs owing to a tiff with their boss and their families having to face the brunt of the loan sharks, the women of the families resort to work in a garment factory to make ends meet. This hurts the ego of the men and their chauvinistic nature brings an all-out divide between themselves and their wives, who are morally right in this situation.

The rest of the story is about the events that take place in resolving the conflict and the chauvinistic men realizing their flaws eventually.

Cast 
Livingston as Ravishankar
Vadivelu as Kabali
Vivek as Ramanathan
Khushbu as Suguna (Voice dubbed by K.R.Anuradha)
Kanaka as Malu (Voice dubbed by Jayageetha)
Kovai Sarala as Ranjitham
Nassar as Gayatri husband
Urvashi as Gayatri
Kumarimuthu as House owner
S. V. Ramadas as Car Mechanic shop owner
Jai Ganesh as Garment Factory owner
Thyagu as Karuppaiyya
Suryakanth as Peon
Kalidaas as Police Inspector

Soundtrack 
The film score and the soundtrack were composed by Deva. The soundtrack, released in 1999, features 5 tracks with lyrics written by Vaali, Kalidasan, Pazhani Bharathi and Thamarai.

Remake

References

External links 

1990s Tamil-language films
1999 comedy-drama films
1999 films
Films directed by V. Sekhar
Films scored by Deva (composer)
Indian comedy-drama films
Tamil films remade in other languages